Lucky Break (released in the United States as Paperback Romance) is a 1994 Australian romantic comedy film directed by Ben Lewin, about a woman with polio who breaks her leg and is treated normally for the first time in her life. Actress Rebecca Gibney was nominated for Best Actress in a Supporting Role by the Australian Film Institute in 1995 for her role in the film.

Cast
Gia Carides as Sophie
Anthony LaPaglia as Edward 'Eddie' Murcer
Rebecca Gibney as Gloria Wrightman
Robyn Nevin as Anne-Marie LePine
Marshall Napier as George LePine

Reception
The film received rave reviews but did not do well at the box office, opening tenth in Australia with a gross of $114,950 in its first week. It went on to gross just $197,540 in Australia.

On review aggregator website Rotten Tomatoes, the film has a score of 33% based on 9 reviews, with an average rating of 5.4/10.

David Stratton of Variety wrote "Lucky Break adds a few new wrinkles to the venerable and resurgent formula of romantic comedy. Writer/director Ben Lewin comes up with some oddball ideas again, but his screenplay lacks the wit and zaniness that might have propelled this modest offering into wider distribution".

References

External links

Lucky Break at Oz Movies

1994 romantic comedy films
Australian romantic comedy films
Films directed by Ben Lewin
1990s English-language films
1990s Australian films